Star Trek III is a board game published by West End Games.

Gameplay
Star Trek III is package which contains three separate solo games: The Kobayashi Maru, Free Enterprise, and The Sherwood Syndrome.

Reception
J. Michael Caparula reviewed Star Trek III in Space Gamer/Fantasy Gamer No. 79. Caparula commented that "I suppose finding that winning formula is what makes this package so attractive. [...] This is a terrific value."

References

External links
Review in Games

Board games based on Star Trek
West End Games games